Jaap Belmer (22 January 1886 – 18 April 1936) was a Dutch wrestler. He competed in the men's Greco-Roman middleweight at the 1908 Summer Olympics. After defeating Wilhelm Grundmann from Germany, he went on to finish in fifth place in the tournament.

References

External links
 

1886 births
1936 deaths
Dutch male sport wrestlers
Olympic wrestlers of the Netherlands
Wrestlers at the 1908 Summer Olympics
Sportspeople from Amsterdam